Cooley Lake is a private, all-sports, 86-acre Oakland County, Michigan lake located in White Lake Township.

Namesake
Solon Cooley (1830-1881), along with his wife Levantia (1836-1910) and their two children, lived on a 158-acre farm in section 36 of White Lake Township, Michigan, on the shore of the lake that was named for them, Cooley Lake.

Solon was originally from Galen, New York.

References

Lakes of Oakland County, Michigan
Lakes of Michigan